Anoxybacillus gonensis is a moderately thermophilic, xylose-utilizing, endospore-forming bacterium. It is Gram-positive and rod-shaped, with type strain G2T (=NCIMB 13933T =NCCB 100040T).

References

Further reading

External links

LPSN

Bacillaceae
Bacteria described in 2003